Helping Hand or Helping Hands may refer to:

Film and television
 Helping Hands (film), a 1941 Our Gang short comedy film
 Helping Hands (American Dad!),  an episode of American Dad!
 Helping Hand (Body of Proof), a 2011 episode of Body of Proof
 "Helping Hand" an episode of Wizards of Waverly Place
 The Helping Hand (1908 American film), a silent film
 The Helping Hand (1908 French film), a silent film

Songs 
 "Helping Hand", a song by Billy Joe Royal, from his 1969 album Cherry Hill Park
 "Helping Hand" (Screaming Jets song), from their 1992 album Tear of Thought
 "Helping Hand", a song by Amy Grant, from her 1994 album House of Love
 "Helping Hands", a song by Quiet Riot, from QR III

Other 
 Helping Hand, the mascot of Hamburger Helper
 Solidarity Helping Hand, a welfare organisation affiliated with the South African trade union Solidarity
 The Helping Hand (halfway house), a voluntary welfare organization in Singapore
 Helping hand (tool), a type of jig used in soldering and craftwork
 Helping Hand Party, a minor British Columbia political party